The men's super-G competition of the Beijing 2022 Olympics was held on Tuesday, 8 February, on the "Rock" course at Yanqing National Alpine Ski Centre ski resort in Yanqing District. Matthias Mayer of Austria defended his 2018 title. Ryan Cochran-Siegle of the United States won the silver medal, and Aleksander Aamodt Kilde of Norway won bronze. For Cochran-Siegle and Aamodt Kilde this was the first Olympic medal.

The 2018 silver medalist, Beat Feuz, and the bronze medalist, Kjetil Jansrud, qualified for the event. Prior to the Olympics, five World Cup super-G events were held: Aamodt Kilde was leading the ranking, followed by Marco Odermatt and Mayer. Vincent Kriechmayr was the reigning world champion, with Romed Baumann and Alexis Pinturault being the silver and bronze medalists, respectively.

Qualification

Results
The race was started at 11:00 local time, (UTC+8).

References

Men's alpine skiing at the 2022 Winter Olympics